{{DISPLAYTITLE:C21H27N3O3S}}
The molecular formula C21H27N3O3S (molar mass: 401.52 g/mol) may refer to:

 E-4031
 Sonepiprazole (U-101,387, PNU-101,387-G)

Molecular formulas